The United States Army Transportation Corps (USATC) S100 Class is a 0-6-0 steam locomotive that was designed for switching (shunting) duties in Europe and North Africa during World War II.  After the war, they were used on railways in Austria, China, Egypt, France, Great Britain, Greece, Iran, Iraq, Israel, Italy, the Netherlands, Palestine, the United States, and Yugoslavia.

Wartime development and use
The S100 is a side tank design by Col. Howard G. Hill.
In 1942, the USATC ordered 382 S100s from Davenport Locomotive Works of Iowa, H. K. Porter, Inc, of Pittsburgh and Vulcan Iron Works of Wilkes-Barre. They were shipped to Great Britain in 1943, where they were stored until 1944. After D-Day, they were shipped to Continental Europe.

Construction

Use after the Second World War
After the Second World War, SNCF bought 77 S100's and designated them class 030TU. Jugoslovenske železnice (Yugoslav State Railways) bought many S100's and designated them class 62. In the 1950s JŽ assembled more examples bringing the number of class 62 to 129. The Hellenic State Railways in Greece acquired 20 S100's and designated them class Δα (Delta-alpha). Österreichische Bundesbahnen in Austria acquired 10 and designated them class 989. Ferrovie dello Stato in Italy acquired four and designated them class 831.

Several were sold into industrial use in the US, including to Georgia Power and Oklahoma Gas & Electric.

The Oranje-Nassau Mijnen, a coal mining company in The Netherlands acquired two S100's (USATC 4389 and 1948)and numbered them ON-26 (Davenport 2533) and ON-27 (Davenport 2513) respectively. The ON-26 survived the scrapyard and was sold to the museum railway Stoomtrein Goes-Borsele.

The Southern Railway (UK) bought 15 S100's (14 for operational use and one for spare parts) and designated them USA Class. Other S100's entered British industrial use with the National Coal Board, Longmoor Military Railway, Austin Motor Company and others.

China acquired about 20 S100's, designating them class XK2. In 1946, Egyptian State Railways bought eight and numbered them 1151–1158. The UK War Department loaned six to Palestine Railways. In 1946 PR bought two of these, both of which subsequently entered the stock of Israel Railways in 1948.

Iraqi State Railways bought five, designated them Class SA, and gave them fleet numbers 1211–1215. All five were Davenport-built examples. At least two were still in service in March 1967: 1211 at Basrah and 1214 as the station pilot at Baghdad West.

Postwar design influence

Several European railways produced designs based on the S100. JŽ added to their Class 62 by ordering several similar examples from Đuro Đaković (factory) of Slavonski Brod, Croatia. These differed in minor details, principally the use of plate frames instead of bar frames, resulting in a higher boiler pitch. This gives the steam pipes a shoulder instead of being straight, and requires smaller domes with a flatter top to fit JŽ's loading gauge.

Poland built several TKh Ferrum Fablok TKh49 locomotives. These have a similar outline but include various differences such as the use of 2 domes instead of 3, driving onto the second axle instead of the third, a different cab, etc.

The British Great Western Railway (GWR) had used many S100s in South Wales during the Second World War. The GWR 1500 Class was partially inspired by the S100 in its use of outside cylinders and short wheelbase.

Continuing commercial use
A small number of former JŽ 62's remain in commercial service, more than 65 years after they were built. At least two work as switchers (shunters) at the ArcelorMittal steel plant in Zenica, Bosnia-Hercegovina.

Survival and preservation
More than 100 S100s survive: either preserved, stored, or derelict. Most are in Europe or North America, but there are also two in China and one in Egypt. Project 62 has an online database of them.

Private owners in Baraboo, Wisconsin, are currently restoring S100 #5002. #5002 was used for the Naval Yards in Philadelphia, Pennsylvania, and later sold to the EJ Lavino Company in Pennsylvania, then sold to the Kentucky Railroad Museum.

In 2006, one was purchased for preservation from steelworks in central Bosnia and was sent to Britain.

In fiction
An engine of this prototype appears in the Thomas & Friends TV series as Rosie.

Gallery

References

External links 
 USA 0-6-0T Southern E-Group
 Loc 4389 Stoomtrein Goes-Borsele
 Project 02

 
S100 Class
War Department locomotives
0-6-0T locomotives
Davenport locomotives
H. K. Porter locomotives
Vulcan Iron Works locomotives
Railway locomotives introduced in 1942
Steam locomotives of Austria
Steam locomotives of Iraq
Steam locomotives of Mandatory Palestine
Steam locomotives of China
Standard gauge steam locomotives of Great Britain
Standard gauge locomotives of Austria
Standard gauge steam locomotives of Egypt
Standard gauge locomotives of Iraq
Standard gauge steam locomotives of Israel
Standard gauge locomotives of Mandatory Palestine
Standard gauge locomotives of China
Shunting locomotives